Bityla defigurata is a moth of the family Noctuidae. It is endemic to New Zealand.

Taxonomy
This species was first described by Francis Walker in 1865 using specimens collected by T. R. Oxley in Nelson and originally named Xylina defigurata. Edward Meyrick placed this species in the genus Bityla and synonymised Bityla thoracica with this species. The female holotype is held at the Natural History Museum, London.

Description
Walker described this species as follows:

Distribution
It is endemic to New Zealand and found in both the North and South Islands.

Behaviour
The adults of this species are on the wing from January to March and is attracted to light.

Host species
The larvae of this species have been reared on Muehlenbeckia australis and Muehlenbeckia complexa.

References

Hadeninae
Moths of New Zealand
Endemic fauna of New Zealand
Moths described in 1865
Taxa named by Francis Walker (entomologist)
Endemic moths of New Zealand